The Singer Building in Pasadena, California is a Spanish Colonial Revival building located at 520 E. Colorado Boulevard in Pasadena, California. Built in 1926, the building was designed by Everett Phipps Babcock and is his only surviving non-residential design. The Spanish Colonial Revival design of the building was popular in Pasadena in the 1920s. Prominent features of the building's design include a red tile roof, a stone frieze with a tiled pattern, and piers with decorative moldings. The building originally housed a Singer Sewing Machine Company showroom and has since been used for other commercial purposes.

The building was listed on the National Register of Historic Places on May 16, 1985.

References

External links

NRHP photos viewable in browser

History of Pasadena, California
Buildings and structures in Pasadena, California
Buildings and structures on the National Register of Historic Places in Pasadena, California
Commercial buildings on the National Register of Historic Places in California
Commercial buildings completed in 1926
Spanish Colonial Revival architecture in California